Pitishevskoye Rural Settlement (Yountapa jal tărăkhĕ) is an administrative and municipal division (a rural settlement) of Alikovsky District of the Chuvash Republic, Russia. It is located in the central part of the district. Its administrative center is the rural locality (a village) of Pitishevo. Rural settlement's population: 1,095 (2006 est.).

Pitishevskoye Rural Settlement comprises six rural localities.

The Cheboksary–Yadrin highway crosses the territory of the rural settlement.

References

Notes

Sources

Further reading
L. A. Yefimov, "Alikovsky District" ("Элӗк Енӗ"), Alikovo, 1994.
"Аликовская энциклопедия" (Alikovsky District's Encyclopedia), authors: Yefimov L. A., Yefimov Ye. L., Ananyev A. A., Terentyev G. K. Cheboksary, 2009, .

External links
Official website of Pitishevskoye Rural Settlement 

Alikovsky District
Rural settlements of Chuvashia

